Adolphe Appian (born as Jacques Barthelemy Adolphe Appian; 28 August 1819 – 29 April 1898) was a French landscape painter and etcher.

Early life 
Appian was born in Lyon and changed his name to Adolphe Appian at age fifteen. At the age of fifteen Appian attended the Ecole des Beaux-Arts at Lyon which was an art school which specialized in training to decorate fabrics by a local silk industry. He studied under Jean-Michel Grobon and Augustin Alexandre Thierrat. Later he opened a studio in Lyon and worked as a graphic designer. He travelled to Paris to finish his studies and after he had exhibited a painting and a charcoal drawing in the Paris Salon in 1853 he became friends with Camille Corot and Charles-François Daubigny who greatly influenced his style. Appian was elected a Chevalier of the Legion of Honour.

Works 
In 1866, Appian's two works that he exhibited in Paris were bought by Napoleon III and by princess Mathilde. He painted at the beginning of his career atmospheric pictures in a monochromatic palette of the riverside of the Rhone and the south of France. In 1870 he changed his style to use brilliant and striking color in his paintings but he still continued to make charcoal drawings as well as small etchings of landscapes in the Barbizon style.

As an etcher, he had a distinct influence on the American artist, Stephen Parrish.

Appian died in Lyon on 29 April 1898.

Gallery

External links 
 Works by Adolphe Appian at the National Gallery of Art

References 

1819 births
1898 deaths
19th-century French painters
French male painters
French printmakers
French etchers
French Realist painters
Landscape artists
Officiers of the Légion d'honneur
Artists from Lyon
19th-century French male artists